The Tyrolean Folk Art Museum is considered one of the finest regional heritage museums in Europe. Located next to the Hofkirche and across from the Hofburg in the Altstadt section of Innsbruck, Austria, the museum contains the most important collection of cultural artifacts from the Tyrol region.

The Tyrolean Folk Art Museum is housed in four wings of a former Franciscan monastery (the displaced community later established Lienz Friary) around an arcaded Renaissance courtyard. The permanent exhibition includes an extensive collection of old handicrafts, traditional costumes, household items, glass and pottery, peasant furniture, textiles, tools, metalwork, and religious and secular folk art from the various regions of Tyrol.

The museum houses several carefully restored wood-paneled rooms from the Gothic, Renaissance, and Baroque periods, that came from actual farms and noble houses. The museum also contains an extensive collection of mangers made of wood, wax, earthenware, and paper, dating back to the eighteenth century.

Gallery

References

External links

 Tiroler Landeesmuseen

Austrian art
Art museums and galleries in Austria
Folk art museums and galleries
Museums in Innsbruck
Tourist attractions in Innsbruck